Nicolas Party (b. July 1, 1980, in Lausanne, Switzerland) is a Swiss visual artist living and working in New York City and Brussels.  
He is known for his multi-media interdisciplinary immersive exhibitions.

He received his BFA from the Lausanne School of Art in 2004 and his MFA from the Glasgow School of Art, in Glasgow, Scotland in 2009.

Party's work has been the subject of solo exhibitions at the Montreal Museum of Fine Arts, Montreal, the Magritte Museum in Brussels, the Dallas Museum of Art, and the Hirshhorn Museum.  For his second exhibition at the Hirshorn  which runs from September 18, 2021 until the spring of 2022 he created his largest work to date Draw the Curtain, it "wraps 360 degrees around the temporary scaffolding that encases the Museum building and spans a circumference of 829 feet". It is an "original pastel painting digitally collaged and printed onto scrim".

Party is represented by Hauser & Wirth, The Modern Institute, Kaufmann Repetto, Gregor Staiger, Karma and Xavier Hufkens.  In February of 2020 he had his first solo exhibition, "Scottsboro" with Hauser & Wirth at their Los Angeles, California venue.

Among the artists Party cites as having influenced his painting are Rosalba Carriera, Félix Vallotton, Milton Avery, Pablo Picasso, and Giorgio Morandi.

Party's landscapes often draw from or even directly cite styles and motifs from a diverse set of contemporary painters and painters of previous generations, including Salvo, a similarity picked up at a number of exhibitions.

Bibliography
Stéphane Aquin, Nicolas Party: Mauve Twilight, 5 Continents Editions, Milan, 2022
Stéphane Aquin, Stefan Banz, Ali Subotnick, Melissa Hyde, Nicolas Party, Phaidon, London, 2022
Louis Fratino, Glenn Fuhrman, Loie Hollowell, Dodie Kazanjian, Billy Sullivan, Robin F. Williams, Melissa Hyde, Nicolas Party: Pastel, The FLAG Art Foundation, New York, 2021
Tobia Bezzola, Francesca Bernasconi, Michele Robecchi, Nicolas Party: Rovine, Museo d'Arte della Svizzera Italiana, Lugano, 2021

References

1980 births
Swiss artists
Swiss contemporary artists
21st-century Swiss painters
Living people
People from Lausanne